Ceramic chemistry  studies the relationship between the physical properties of fired ceramics and ceramic glazes and their chemistry. Although ceramic technicians have long understood many of these relationships, the advent of computer software to automate the conversion from batch to formula and analysis has brought this science within the reach of many more people. Physical properties of glazes in fired products (like thermal expansion, hardness, index of refraction, color and melting temperature or range) are directly (but not solely) related to the chemistry. Properties of glass melts like viscosity and surface tension are also principally products of chemistry.

Technicians in the ceramic tableware, artware, sanitaryware, glass, fiberglass, bottle glass, optical and related industries all use this science.

In ceramic chemistry, fired glazes are viewed as composed of oxides (examples are SiO2, Al2O3, B2O3, Na2O, K2O, CaO, Li2O, MgO, ZnO, MnO, Fe2O3, CoO). Each oxide is known to contribute specific properties to the fired glass. Many materials suppliers publish chemical analyses of their products that cite percentages of these oxides as well as volatile components (components that burn away during firing giving off gases and fumes such as H2O, CO2, SO3).

For example, in traditional ceramics here are some examples of what the application of ceramic chemistry can accomplish.

 Fix glaze defects like crazing, blistering, pin-holing, settling, clouding, leaching, crawling, marking, scratching, powdering
 Substitute frits, incorporate better, cheaper materials, or replace no-longer-available ones
 Adjust glaze melting temperature, gloss, surface character and color (in ceramics color is a matter of chemistry)
 Identify weaknesses (e.g. proximity to volatile firing zones, use of unreliable materials) in glazes to avoid problems
 Creating and optimizing base glazes to work with difficult colors or stains and for special effects dependent on opacification, crystallization or variegation
 Create glazes from scratch and use native materials in the highest possible percentage

In ceramic bodies the physical properties of the final fired product are often more related to the firing curve, the physical properties (e.g. particle size and shape, decomposition history) of the ingredient materials and the mineralogy and interaction between the different particle types.

References

 Ceramic chemistry - H. H. Stephenson - Google Books

Pottery
Inorganic chemistry